"Many a Long & Lonesome Highway" is a song co-written and recorded by American country music artist Rodney Crowell.  It was released in September 1989 as the first single from Crowell's album Keys to the Highway.  The song reached number 3 on the Billboard Hot Country Singles & Tracks chart in January 1990 and number 1 on the RPM Country Tracks chart in Canada.  It was written by Crowell and Will Jennings.

Chart performance

Year-end charts

References

1989 singles
Rodney Crowell songs
Songs written by Rodney Crowell
Song recordings produced by Tony Brown (record producer)
Songs with lyrics by Will Jennings
Columbia Nashville Records singles
1989 songs
Song recordings produced by Rodney Crowell